The French Sex Murders (Italian: Casa d'appuntamento (Translation: House of Rendezvous) is a 1972 giallo film directed by Ferdinando Merighi under the pseudonym "F. L. Morris", and edited by Bruno Mattei.  It was released as The French Sex Murders in the US, and The Bogey Man and the French Murders in the UK. It stars Rosalba Neri, Anita Ekberg, Barbara Bouchet, Howard Vernon and Gordon Mitchell. The actor who played the police inspector in this film (Robert Sacchi) was a professional Humphrey Bogart lookalike, which explains the alternate "Bogey Man" title. Special effects technician Carlo Rambaldi handled the throat slashings and beheadings that take place in the movie.

Plot
A petty criminal named Antoine (Peter Martell) is blamed for the murder of a prostitute who was killed at Madame Collette's exclusive whorehouse in Paris. He is sentenced to death by guillotine, and he swears revenge on everyone who helped convict him. At the last moment, he manages to escape from the prison – but is then decapitated in a motorcycle accident. A scientist Prof. Waldemar obtains the criminal's severed head from the morgue for purposes of experimentation. The judge, who sentenced Antoine to death later turns up murdered, and then one by one, the prostitutes at Madame Collette's begin turning up murdered as well. Everyone believes that Antoine is causing the murders to happen, and that he is wreaking vengeance from beyond the grave.

Cast

Main
 Anita Ekberg as Madame Colette
 Rosalba Neri as Marianne
 Evelyne Kraft as Eleonora (Credited as Evelyne Elgar)
 Howard Vernon as Professor Waldemar
 Pietro Martellanza as Antoine Gottvalles (Credited as Peter Martell)
 Barbara Bouchet as Francine
 Robert Sacchi as Inspector Fontaine
 Eva Astor as Florence
 Renato Romano as Mr. Randall
 Rolf Eden as Pepi
 Franco Borelli as Roger Delluc 
 Piera Viotti as Tina
 William Alexander as George
 Ada Pometti as Doris the Maid
 Alessandro Perrella as Doris' Lover

Cameo/Uncredited
 Flavia Keyt as Prostitute
 Gordon Mitchell as Man in Nightclub
 Mike Monty as Detective
 Xiro Papas as Thug in Bar
 Riccardo Petrazzi as Other Man Repairing a Van
 Dick Randall as Mr. Hassan
 Goffredo Unger as Man Repairing a Van

Critical reception 
Allmovie gave it a mixed review, writing "The contrived script [...] is completely off the hook, which fans of the giallo form will be expecting, but those who come to the film cold may be somewhat nonplussed."

References

External links 

 
 
 Casa d'appuntamento at Variety Distribution

Giallo films
1972 films
1970s crime thriller films
Films scored by Bruno Nicolai
1970s Italian films